The 2016–17 Belarusian Extraliga season was the 25th season of the Belarusian Extraliga, the top level of ice hockey in Belarus. Twelve teams participated in the league, and Neman Grodno won the championship.

Teams

First round

Second round

Group A

Group B

Playoffs

External links 

Official site

References 

bel
Belarusian Extraleague seasons
Extraleague